Carlos "Charly" Javier Galosi (born June 1, 1975) is an Argentine ski mountaineer and mountain climber

Galosi was born and lives in San Carlos de Bariloche. He studied at National University of Comahue.

Selected results 
 2005: 2nd, South American Championship, individual
 2009: 2nd, South American Championship, individual

References 

1975 births
Living people
Sportspeople from Bariloche
Argentine male ski mountaineers
National University of Comahue alumni